Andreas Pavel is a German-Brazilian cultural producer and media designer who is generally credited with patenting the personal stereo, although his claim in the United Kingdom was revoked after Judges ruled his patent "obvious and not significantly inventive".

Born in Brandenburg an der Havel, Germany, Pavel was the son of a German industrialist and vice-president of the Federation of German in Industries. At six years of age, his family moved to Morumbi, São Paulo where his father took a managing position at Matarazzo Industries.

Having studied philosophy and social sciences at the Free University of Berlin, Pavel returned to Brazil in 1967 and started his professional career as head of programming of the newly founded public broadcasting station, TV Cultura. 1970 he took up editorial planning at Abril Cultural, where he edited partwork encyclopaedias for nationwide newsstand distribution, most notably the philosophical source collection "Great Thinkers" and a reference series of "Brazilian Popular Music".

In March 1977, Pavel filed the a patent application for his Stereobelt in Italy, followed by further applications in Germany, United States, United Kingdom, and Japan. Pavel subsequently tried to interest companies like Uher, Beyer, B&O, and Brionvega in manufacturing his device.

In 1989, Pavel started infringement proceedings against Sony in the UK. Four years later, the British patent was invalidated by a British judge. The exact settlement fee is not known, but European press accounts said that Pavel received a cash settlement in excess of $10,000,000 and is now also receiving royalties on some Walkman sales.

References

Further reading 
 Percezione senza più limiti – parla il padre di Walkman e iPod (Il Sole 24 Ore 21/09/2006)
 Jacques Attali, Une brève Histoire de l’Avenir (Paris, 2006)
 Jack Challoner, ed, 1001 Inventions that changed the world (London, 2009)
 Revista Veja, Especial “Os Pioneiros” (São Paulo 31/08/2011)
 Eric Chaline, 50 Machines that changed the course of History (London, 2012) 
 Rainer Schönhammer, Der Walkman: Eine phänomenologische Untersuchung (München, 1988)

1945 births
Living people
20th-century German inventors
Brazilian inventors
Brazilian people of German descent